WDHR (93.1 FM) is a radio station  broadcasting a country music format. Licensed to Pikeville, Kentucky, United States. The station is currently owned by Lynn Parrish, through licensee Mountain Top Media LLC, and features programming from ABC News Radio and Premiere Radio Networks.

References

External links

DHR
Pikeville, Kentucky
Country radio stations in Kentucky